The Billy Minardi Classic is an annual college basketball event hosted by the University of Louisville. The event is named after Billy Minardi, Louisville Head Coach Rick Pitino's brother-in-law. Minardi was killed in the terrorist attacks of September 11, 2001. The event has featured December doubleheader and single games at Freedom Hall and the KFC Yum! Center.

History
The Classic was founded in 2002 and named after Billy Minardi, Rick Pitino's deceased brother-in-law.  The Classic features at least one game with Louisville each season. Typically the event features a doubleheader, but has also been a single-game event.  Originally the game was played at Freedom Hall until Louisville moved its home games to the KFC Yum! Center.  In 2015 the event featured a two-day, four-team tournament.

References

Louisville Cardinals men's basketball
College men's basketball competitions in the United States
Recurring sporting events established in 2002
Basketball competitions in Louisville, Kentucky
2002 establishments in Kentucky